Access point or Access Point may refer to:
Access Point (Antarctica), a rocky point on Anvers Island, Antarctica
Wireless access point, a device to connect to a wireless computer network
Subject access point, a method in a bibliographic database by which books, journals, and other documents are accessed

See also